Charles Dingley Heywood (1881–1957) was a member of a family prominent in the early history of Berkeley, California.  He served as mayor of the City of Berkeley from 1913 to 1915.  In 1925, he was appointed as the local Postmaster, serving until 1933.  He ran unsuccessfully for Congress on the Republican ticket in 1934.

Charles was born in Berkeley on May 5, 1881.  His parents were Samuel Heywood and Emma Francis Dingley.  His father served as President of the Board of Trustees of the Town of Berkeley from 1889 to 1890.

Charles married his wife Ethel in 1915.  They had two daughters, Muriel and Bernice.

Charles Heywood died on March 24, 1957, while hospitalized in San Francisco.

External links
 Berkeley Gazette, March 25, 1957
 Heywood Genealogy

Mayors of Berkeley, California
1881 births
1957 deaths
20th-century American politicians
California Republicans